= Diaphragmatic surface =

Diaphragmatic surface can refer to:

- Diaphragmatic surface of heart
- Diaphragmatic surface of liver
- Diaphragmatic surface of lung
- Diaphragmatic surface of spleen
